Himali Siriwardena is a Sri Lankan film and teledrama actress and a dancer by profession.

Career 
Siriwardena is a popular dancer in Sri Lanka, before she appeared in cinema and television acting. She has acted in several movies including Suwanda Denuna Jeewithe, King Hunther and commercially successful Ranja. She has also received critical acclaim for her acting on teledramas including Sandagalathenna. Himali also runs her own dancing troupe, 'The Sensations', but it has broken due to many disputes.

In 2017, she appeared in the team Shakyans in a reality show Hiru Mega Stars telecasted by Hiru TV. In 2019, after a brief hiatus, she acted in the comedy television serial Sihina Samagama. In 2021, she appeared as a judge in the dance reality show Hiru Super Dancers.

Selected TV serials
 Athuru Paara
 Ayal 
 Binari
 Dedunnai Adare
 Ehipillamak Yata  
 Ingi Bingi
 Dekada Kada
 Sandagalathenna
 Sihina Samagama
 Yaya 4

Filmography
 No. denotes the Number of Sri Lankan film in the Sri Lankan cinema.

References

External links
 ජාතික රූපවාහිනියට කළු සෙවනැල්ලක්
 සම්මානනීය නිළි හිමාලි සිරිවර්ධන මද්දුමී ගැන කී අපූරු කතාව

Living people
Sri Lankan film actresses
Year of birth missing (living people)